Belisana (minor planet designation: 178 Belisana) is a stony background asteroid from the inner regions of the asteroid belt, approximately  in diameter. It was discovered on 6 November 1877, by Austrian astronomer Johann Palisa at the Austrian Naval Observatory in today's Croatia. The S-type asteroid has a rotation period of 12.32 hours and a rather spherical shape. It was named after the Celtic goddess Belisama (Belisana).

Orbit and classification 

Belisana is a non-family asteroid from the main belt's background population. It orbits the Sun in the inner main-belt at a distance of 2.4–2.6 AU once every 3 years and 10 months (1,409 days; semi-major axis of 2.46 AU). Its orbit has an eccentricity of 0.04 and an inclination of 2° with respect to the ecliptic.

Physical characteristics 

Belisana has been characterized as a common, stony S-type asteroid in both the Tholen and SMASS classification.

Rotation period 

Photometric observations of this asteroid from multiple observatories during 2007 gave a light curve with a period of 12.321 ± 0.002 hours and a brightness variation of 0.10 ± 0.03 in magnitude. This is in agreement with a study performed in 1992. However, it is possible that the light curve may have a period of 24.6510 ± 0.0003 hours; it will require further study to exclude this solution.

Diameter and albedo 

According to the surveys carried out by the Infrared Astronomical Satellite IRAS, the Japanese Akari satellite and the NEOWISE mission of NASA's Wide-field Infrared Survey Explorer, Belisana measures between 35.81 and 42.09 kilometers in diameter and its surface has an albedo between 0.214 and 0.2438.

The Collaborative Asteroid Lightcurve Link derives an albedo of 0.2026 and a diameter of 35.50 kilometers based on an absolute magnitude of 9.6.

Naming 

This minor planet was named after the goddess Belisama (or Belisana) from Celtic mythology, meaning "queen of heaven", the most warlike goddess among British Celts, and equivalent to the goddesses Athene or Minerva. The official naming citation was mentioned in The Names of the Minor Planets by Paul Herget in 1955.

References

External links 
 Asteroid Lightcurve Database (LCDB), query form (info )
 Dictionary of Minor Planet Names, Google books
 Asteroids and comets rotation curves, CdR – Observatoire de Genève, Raoul Behrend
 Discovery Circumstances: Numbered Minor Planets (1)-(5000) – Minor Planet Center
 
 

000178
Discoveries by Johann Palisa
Named minor planets
000178
000178
18771106